The children of prime ministers of India have been the subject of widespread public attention. There are 41 children of former prime ministers of India.

Several of the children of former prime ministers have entered politics. Two have become prime ministers themselves.

P. V. Narasimha Rao had 8 children, the most of any prime minister. Two prime ministers - Atal Bihari Vajpayee and Narendra Modi - have had no biological children. However, Vajpayee had an adoptive daughter while Modi has raised a Nepalese boy.

Jawaharlal Nehru

Lal Bahadur Shastri

Indira Gandhi

Morarji Desai

Charan Singh

Rajiv Gandhi

Vishwanath Pratap Singh

Chandra Shekhar

P. V. Narasimha Rao

H. D. Deve Gowda

Inder Kumar Gujral

Atal Bihari Vajpayee

Manmohan Singh

Narendra Modi 
Narendra Modi has no biological or adoptive children.

See also 
 Nehru–Gandhi family
 List of children of presidents of the United States

References 

Children of prime ministers of India
Lists relating to prime ministers of India